Three Pests in a Mess is a 1945 short subject directed by Del Lord starring American slapstick comedy team The Three Stooges (Moe Howard, Larry Fine and Curly Howard). It is the 83rd entry in the series released by Columbia Pictures starring the comedians, who released 190 shorts for the studio between 1934 and 1959.

Plot
The Stooges are inventors trying to obtain a patent for their fly-catching invention. Whilst learning they must catch 100,000 flies to get their patent, their conversation is overheard by several crooks across the hallway. Unfortunately, the crooks think Curly has $100,000. A flirtatious woman (Christine McIntyre) who is part of the nest of crooks corners the gullible Curly and tries to finagle the non-existent money out of him. When he confesses that the 100,000 are indeed flies and not dollars, she turns against him, and has the crooks go after the Stooges.

The trio take cover in a sporting goods store where two guns hit them on the head two times then Curly accidentally shoots a mannequin. In their infinite wisdom, the Stooges believe they have killed a real human, and go about trying to bury the "body" in a nearby pet cemetery. Unfortunately, the cemetery's night watchman (Snub Pollard) sees the Stooges prowling around and informs cemetery owner Philip Black (Vernon Dent), who happens to be attending a masquerade party with his partners. The owner arrives at the cemetery, replete in the spookiest outfits possible, Curly throws the mannequin in the hole but the guys in the hole throw the mannequin back out of the hole Curly throws the mannequin back in the hole and then the guys pop up out of the hole and frighten the Stooges away.

Cast
 Jerry Howard as Curly
 Larry Fine as Larry
 Moe Howard as Moe
 Victor Travers as Patent Office man
 Brian O'Hara as I. Cheatham
 Christine McIntyre as con woman
 Robert Williams as I. Cheatham's partner
 Vernon Dent as Philip Black
 Heinie Conklin as man in Devil costume (Philip Black's assistant)
 William Kelley as man in Skeleton costume (Philip Black's other assistant)
 Snub Pollard as cemetery guard
 Johnny Kascier as man in window
 Paul Kruger as Cop

Production notes
Three Pests in a Mess was filmed on June 22–26, 1944. It a partial remake of the 1933 Paramount Pictures short film Sailors Beware! (also directed by Del Lord) and 1941 Columbia short film Ready, Willing But Unable. The concept of men trolling through a cemetery with a dead body dates back to Laurel and Hardy's 1928 silent film Habeas Corpus.

The syncopated, jazz-tinged version of "Three Blind Mice", first heard in Gents Without Cents, makes its return with this film. This version would be used for the next two releases, as well as Three Loan Wolves, before being retired permanently. This version is played in the key of F major, while the key of G major was previously utilized.

This is the ninth of sixteen Stooge shorts with the word "three" in the title.

Curly's "Call for Philip Black" mimics the popular 'Call for Philip Morris' cigarette advertisements of the period.

A prop man dug a hole and covered it with rubber to achieve the effect of Larry sliding under the door at the cemetery. They quickly pulled him under, and filmed the shot as a speed shot.

The math is wrong: they calculate a penny a fly, and since they need $100, 10,000 flies would be needed, and not 100,000 as stated.

Several publications erroneously list the running time of this film as 17:41.

In popular culture
Three Pests in a Mess was one of four Stooge films included in the TBS 1992 Halloween special Three Stooges Fright Night. It was replaced by Spooks! and The Hot Scots in its 1995 airing.

References

External links 
 
 
Three Pests in a Mess at threestooges.net

1945 films
1945 comedy films
The Three Stooges films
American black-and-white films
Columbia Pictures short films
American comedy short films
Films directed by Del Lord
1940s English-language films
1940s American films